Patterson's People is an album by organist Don Patterson recorded in 1964 and released on the Prestige label.

Reception

Allmusic writer Eugene Chadbourne awarded the album 4 stars stating "It's classic stuff".

Track listing 
All compositions by Don Patterson except as noted
 "Love Me with All Your Heart" (Rafael Gaston Perez) - 6:20   
 "42639" (Sonny Stitt) - 5:20   
 "Please Don't Talk About Me When I'm Gone" (Sam H. Stept, Sidney Clare) - 5:40   
 "Sentimental Journey" (Les Brown, Bud Green) - 10:55   
 "Theme For Dee" - 6:30  
Recorded at Van Gelder Studio in Englewood Cliffs, New Jersey on March 19 (tracks 2 & 3), May 12 (track 1) and July 10 (tracks 4 & 5), 1964

Personnel 
Don Patterson - organ
Sonny Stitt - alto saxophone, tenor saxophone, vocals (tracks 2 & 3)
Booker Ervin - tenor saxophone (tracks 1 & 4)
Billy James - drums

References 

Don Patterson (organist) albums
Booker Ervin albums
Sonny Stitt albums
1965 albums
Prestige Records albums
Albums produced by Ozzie Cadena
Albums recorded at Van Gelder Studio